Cyperus gayi is a species of sedge that is native to parts of French Guiana.

See also 
 List of Cyperus species

References 

gayi
Plants described in 1936
Flora of French Guiana
Taxa named by Georg Kükenthal